Shirley Wilmotte Wynne M.D., Dr. P.H. (1882-1942) was the New York City Health Commissioner from 1928 through 1933.  He was considered “a leader in public health and child welfare initiatives throughout his career.”,

References

Commissioners of Health of the City of New York
1882 births
1942 deaths